Tracey Ullman: Live and Exposed is an HBO comedy special starring Tracey Ullman. The stage show documents Ullman's rise to fame with reenactments of her childhood as well as her career as a performer. Many of her television characters also appear, along with their origin stories. The characters are performed with no makeup and little costuming.

The special was filmed at The Fonda Theatre in Los Angeles, where it ran for ten performances. The show, which was being readied for a Broadway run, had the working title Tracey's Best Bits.

Cast
 Tracey Ullman as Herself
 Scott Fowler as Dancer
 Vince Pesce as Dancer 
 Anna Rustowitz as Dancer
 Anna A. White as Dancer
 Sandra K. Horner as Fan (uncredited)

Reception

Awards and nominations

Home media
The special was released on DVD by HBO Home Video on September 5, 2005 in the United States.

References

External links
 
 Tracey Ullman: Live and Exposed promo

Tracey Ullman
HBO network specials
2000s American television specials
2005 television specials